Bindha railway station located on the Shorncliffe line in Queensland, Australia. It is one of two stations serving the Brisbane suburb of Virginia, the other being Virginia railway station on the Caboolture line.

Adjacent to the station is the Golden Circle cannery at Northgate, with the station originally built to provide a stop for the factory workers. Immediately north of the station lies the sidings for the Banyo railway workshops, which closed in 1995, years later reworked for the stabling of up to 4 six car units.

Services
Bindha station is served by all stops Shorncliffe line services from Shorncliffe to Roma Street, Cannon Hill, Manly and Cleveland.

Services by platform

References

External links

Bindha station Queensland Rail
Bindha station Queensland's Railways on the Internet
[ Bindha station] TransLink travel information

Railway stations in Brisbane
Banyo, Queensland
Virginia, Queensland